= Guy Ménard =

Canadian poet and writer

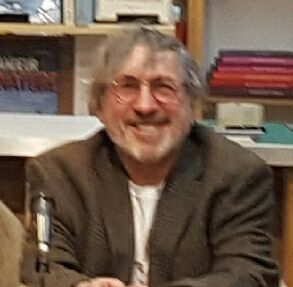
Guy Ménard

Guy Ménard (born 1948 in Granby, Quebec, Canada) is a Canadian sociologist, a professor, a novelist and a poet. He was a professor in the department of religious sciences at the Université du Québec à Montréal and director of the journal Religiologiques.

== Publications ==
- From Sodomy to Exodus, 1993
- The ruses of the technique, 1988
- A small treaty of the real religion - For those who wish to understand a little better the 21st century, 1999
- The acute accent, 1983
- Jamädhlavie, 1990
- Fragments, 1978
- Hiéroclips. Haïkus baroques, 1998
- The cloisters, 2000
- Moon of the winds, 2007
- Confections, 2016
